Biscotti are Italian almond biscuits from Prato, Italy

Biscotti may also refer to:

 Biscotti Regina, small Italian biscuits
 Enrico Biscotti Company, bakery and restaurant in Pittsburgh T
 Rossella Biscotti, (born 1978), Italian visual artist